Girl Code is a comedy television series.

Girl Code may also refer to:

"Girl Code", a 2015 song by Luann de Lesseps
 Girl Code (album), a 2018 album by City Girls
"The Girl Code", an episode from the twenty-seventh season of The Simpsons
Female bonding

See also
Girls Who Code, a nonprofit organization supporting women in computer science
CodeGirl, a 2015 documentary film
Ladies' Code, a South Korean girl group